The Vancouver Stock Exchange (VSE) was a stock exchange based in Vancouver, British Columbia. It was incorporated 1906. On November 29, 1999 the VSE was merged into the Canadian Venture Exchange (CDNX).

History
It was incorporated 1906 and was the third major stock exchange in Canada, after the Toronto Stock Exchange (TSX) and Montreal Stock Exchange (MSE), and featured many small-capitalization, mining, oil and gas-exploration stocks.

In 1989, Forbes magazine labelled the VSE the "scam capital of the world."  In 1991, it listed some 2,300 stocks. Some local figures stated that the majority of these stocks were either total failures or frauds. A 1994 report by James Matkin (Vancouver Stock Exchange & Securities Regulation Commission) made reference to "shams, swindles and market manipulations" within the VSE. Regardless, it had roughly C$4 billion in annual trading in 1991.

On November 29, 1999 the VSE was merged into the Canadian Venture Exchange (CDNX) (now known as the TSX Venture Exchange), along with the Alberta Stock Exchange (ASE) and the minor-cap stocks from the Bourse de Montréal (MSE). The trading floor of the old VSE remained as the trading floor of the new CDNX.

Rounding errors on its Index price
The history of the exchange's index provides a standard case example of large errors arising from seemingly innocuous floating point calculations. In January 1982 the index was initialized at 1000 and subsequently updated and truncated to three decimal places on each trade. Such a thing was done about 3000 times each day. The accumulated truncations led to an erroneous loss of around 25 points per month. Over the weekend of November 25–28, 1983, the error was corrected, raising the value of the index from its Friday closing figure of 524.811 to 1098.892.

See also
 
List of former stock exchanges in the Americas 
 List of stock exchange mergers in the Americas
 List of stock exchanges
Toronto Stock Exchange

References

Further reading
Cruise, David; Griffiths, Alison. Fleecing the Lamb: The Inside Story of the Vancouver Stock Exchange. Douglas & Mcintyre Ltd. 1987 

Stock exchanges in Canada
Economy of Vancouver
Defunct stock exchanges
1906 establishments in British Columbia
1999 disestablishments in British Columbia
Financial services companies based in British Columbia